Live in  Punkow is a compilation album of live material released by CCCP Fedeli alla linea in 1996, that is six years after the band disbanded. The songs were recorded live during the 1980s.

Track listing

 "Live in Pankow" - 2:47
 "Spot" - 0:22 (it's not a song)
 "CCCP" - 1:32
 "Dies Irae" (traditional)
 "Militanz" - 3:02
 "Sono come tu mi vuoi" - 2:52
 "Profezia della Sibilla" - 1:34
 "Curami" - 4:22
 "Radio Popolare" - 0:27 (it's not a song)
 "B.B.B." - 2:43
 "Spara Jurij" - 1:51
 "Trafitto" - 2:51
 "Stati di agitazione" - 4:23
 "U.N." - 4:46
 "Io sto bene" - 4:30
 "Manifesto" - 4:31
 "Tien An Men" - 3:09
 "La Madonna appare" - 0:59 (it's not a song)
 "Maciste all`inferno" - 11:17                             
 "Tube Disasters" (Flux of Pink Indians cover) (hidden track)
 "Spara Jurij" (hidden track)

Personnel 

 Giovanni Lindo Ferretti - vocals
 Annarella Giudici - Benemerita soubrette
 Ignazio Orlando - bass, keyboards, drums
 Carlo Chiapparini - guitar
 Massimo Zamboni - guitar
 Fatur - Artista del popolo
 Silvia Bonvicini - 
 Umberto Negri - bass (1982-1985)
 Zeo Giudici - Drums

See also
 CCCP discography
 Consorzio Suonatori Indipendenti (C.S.I.)
 Per Grazia Ricevuta (PGR)
 Punk rock

References and footnotes

CCCP Fedeli alla linea albums
1996 live albums
Virgin Records live albums
Italian-language albums